Edna or EDNA may refer to:

Places

United States 
Edna, California, a census-designated place
Edna Lake, Idaho
Edna, Iowa, an unincorporated town in Lyon County
Edna Township, Cass County, Iowa
Edna, Kansas, a city
Edna, Kentucky, an unincorporated community
Edna Township, Otter Tail County, Minnesota
Edna Township, Barnes County, North Dakota
Edna, Texas, a city
Edna, Washington, an unincorporated community
Edna, West Virginia, an unincorporated community

Outer space 
445 Edna, an asteroid

Arts and entertainment
 Edna (album), a 2020 album by Headie One

People and fictional characters
Edna (given name)

Other uses
DNA#Extracellular nucleic acids – eDNA (extracellular DNA)
Edna High School, Edna, Texas
Edna, the Inebriate Woman, 1971 television drama
 Electronic Declarations for National Authorities, a software developed by OPCW for national authorities
Environmental DNA (eDNA), DNA isolated from natural settings for the purpose of screening for the presence/absence of certain species
 Ethylenedinitramine, an explosive
Tropical Storm Edna (disambiguation), various cyclones, storms and a hurricane

See also 
Edna Valley AVA, American Viticultural Area in California 
Edna-Star colony, Alberta, Canada
Enda